Diller has several uses including:

People with the surname 

Barry Diller (b. 1942), American businessman
Burgoyne Diller (1906–1965), American abstract painter
Dwight Diller (b. 1946), American musician
Phyllis Diller (1917–2012), American comedian
Na'aman Diller (d. 2004), Israeli thief who robbed the Museum for Islamic Art

Other uses 

Killer Diller (2004 film), a drama film
Killer Diller (1948 film), a musical film
Diller, Nebraska

Surnames of German origin
German-language surnames
Occupational surnames